Geoffrey Chase Scott (February 22, 1942 – February 23, 2021) was an American actor and stuntman best known for appearing on the television series Dynasty for two seasons (1982 to 1984) as Mark Jennings, the first husband of Krystle Carrington (played by series star Linda Evans). Other nighttime series regular contracts included Concrete Cowboys and Cliff Hangers. In film he co-starred with Jane Fonda in The Morning After. His last appearance before retiring was in Hulk.

Early years 
Scott was born on February 22, 1942, in Hollywood, California. His parents were Reed (a manager with Lockheed) and Jayne (a housewife), and he had a brother, Don..

Career 
Scott also appeared on numerous daytime soap operas, playing Sky Rumson on Dark Shadows in 1970, Jeffrey Jordan on Where the Heart Is in 1972, David McAllister on General Hospital in 1989, and Billy Lewis on Guiding Light in 1994. Scott had a leading role in the HBO sitcom 1st & Ten in the 1980s, was featured in almost 100 commercials and guest starred on many series during the 70's, 80's and 90's.

Personal life 
Scott married Tanya Thompson, his high school sweetheart, in 1960. They divorced in 1962. Scott married producer Carol Engelhart Scott in 1975, and they divorced in 1988. In 1988, he was involved in a serious accident when he was pinned between two cars while riding a bicycle. Both his legs were crushed, but he went on to make a full recovery. He lived in Louisville, Colorado, with his wife, Cheri Catherine (whom he married in 1993). and his twin sons Christopher and Matthew

Death 
Scott died from Parkinson's disease In Broomfield, Colorado, on February 23, 2021, a day after his 79th birthday.

Filmography

References

External links
 
 

1942 births
2021 deaths
American male television actors
Male actors from Hollywood, Los Angeles
Deaths from Parkinson's disease
Neurological disease deaths in Colorado